A statue of Abraham Lincoln by American artist Gaetano Cecere is installed along Lincoln Memorial Drive in Milwaukee, Wisconsin, United States. The 10'6" bronze sculpture depicts a young beardless Abraham Lincoln. The former president stands looking down with both hands at his sides.

Description
Gaetano Cecere's Abraham Lincoln stands tall at 10'6". The full-length portrait shows a young beardless Lincoln looking down. The cast bronze sculpture sits on a Wausau red granite pedestal. There are various inscriptions on the sculpture. The lower left corner of the back of the bronze base reads:

The lower right corner of the back of the bronze base reads:

The front of the base reads:

The granite pedestal's west face reads:

The pedestal's south face reads:

The pedestal's east face has four quotes by different individuals. These are:

"One of Nature's Masterful Great Men" Richard Henry Stoddard
"A Man Inspired of God" Henry Watterson
"The Man of the People" Edwin Markham
"The First American" James Russell Lowell.

Historical information
Abraham Lincoln came to Milwaukee on September 30, 1859. He spoke at Wisconsin Agricultural Society, as well as to a group at the Newhall House. In 1916 the Lincoln Memorial Association, a group organized by Mayor Daniel Hoan, decided to commission a sculpture to commemorate the 60th anniversary of this event. A public subscription campaign raised $23,000 for the sculpture. This money was donated by schoolchildren, the business community, and members of the E.B Wolcott Post of the G.A.R.

Unfortunately, the sculpture was not able to be built right away as the United States became involved in World War I. In 1932 the Lincoln Memorial Association hosted a national competition for the Abraham Lincoln sculpture's design. Gaetano Cecere, a sculptor from New York City, won. He designed a sculpture that showed a young beardless Lincoln, standing up with his hands at his sides. The sculptor decided to portray the President without his famous beard because Lincoln did not grow a beard until he was 52. Pencil Points, an architecture magazine, asserted that Cecere's depiction of Lincoln represented one of the best of the hundreds that had been sculpted of the Emancipator." The red granite pedestal was designed by Ferdinand Eisman.

The sculpture's dedication ceremony took place on September 15, 1934.

Location history
The sculpture was originally placed on Lincoln Memorial Drive looking to the west. It was placed in storage in 1954 when the War Memorial Center construction began. It was subsequently placed in front of the Benevolent and Protective Order of Elks Club on East Wisconsin Avenue. It was once again placed on the Lincoln Memorial Drive bridge in 1986, with Lincoln's face directed towards the north within the War Memorial's plaza.

Artist
Gaetano Cecere was born in New York City. He studied art at the National Academy of Art in New York and at the Beaux-Arts Institute in Paris. He was awarded the Prix de Rome in 1920, and became a Fellow of Sculpture at the American Academy in Rome from 1920–22. Afterwards Cecere moved back to New York and became a professor at Cooper Union. He was subsequently named Director of the Department of Sculpture.

In 1938 Cecere was named National Acdemician. He belonged to the National Academy of Design, the National Sculpture Society, and the New York Architectural League. Cecere's work reflected his interest in the beauty and simplicity of early Greek art. In addition to the Abraham Lincoln, he designed the U.S. Army's Soldier Medal for Valor for the United States Mint, as well as the Art in Trade Club Medal for the School of Art League of New York, the John F. Stevens Monument in Montana, and the Columbia Broadcasting Guest Award Medal.

See also
 List of statues of Abraham Lincoln
 List of sculptures of presidents of the United States

References

Notes

Bibliography

Buck, Diane M. and Virginia A. Palmer (1995). Outdoor Sculpture in Milwaukee: A Cultural and Historical Guidebook, The State Historical Society of Wisconsin, Madison.

External links

 There is no Easy Way from the Earth to the Stars
 Mother and Child

1934 establishments in Wisconsin
1934 sculptures
Bronze sculptures in Wisconsin
Monuments and memorials to Abraham Lincoln in the United States
Outdoor sculptures in Milwaukee
Relocated buildings and structures in Wisconsin
Sculptures of men in Wisconsin
Statues in Wisconsin
Milwaukee